The 1983 Smithwicks Irish Professional Championship was a professional invitational snooker tournament, which took place between 9 and 13 March 1983. The tournament was played at the Maysfield Leisure Centre in Belfast, Northern Ireland, and featured eight professional players.

Alex Higgins won the title beating Dennis Taylor 16–11 in the final.

Main draw

References

Irish Professional Championship
Irish Professional Championship
Irish Professional Championship
Irish Professional Championship